Cambodia Cycling Academy is a Cambodian UCI Continental cycling team founded in 2020.

Team roster

Major wins
2020
Stage 1 Tour de Serbie, Roman Maikin

References

External links

UCI Continental Teams (Asia)
Cycling teams established in 2020